Charles Graham (February 24, 1965 – May 19, 2020) was an American politician in the Democratic Party who represented the 19th Senate District in the Missouri General Assembly, which includes the city of Columbia, Missouri, where he lived.

Graham was born in St. Louis, Missouri. He graduated from the University of Illinois at Urbana-Champaign in 1987 with a B.S. in journalism.

He was first elected to the Missouri House of Representatives in 1996, and served there through 2005. He was first elected to the Missouri State Senate in 2004, and served as the party's Assistant Minority Floor Leader. He had been mentioned as a possible candidate in the 2006 United States Senate election, but dropped out in support of then-State Auditor Claire McCaskill.

He served on the following committees:
Education
Gubernatorial Appointments
Judiciary and Civil and Criminal Jurisprudence
Pensions, Veterans' Affairs and General Laws

In 1998, Graham proposed a bill which would have permitted death row prisoners awaiting execution to donate organs (kidneys or bone marrow) in exchange for a commutation of their death sentence. He was a strong supporter of stem-cell research.

On October 20, 2007, Graham was arrested by the Columbia Police Department on suspicion of driving while intoxicated after rear-ending a vehicle near his home in Southwest Columbia. His license was subsequently suspended.

Graham was a paraplegic after he had an automobile accident at 16. He received national attention during a 2008 televised campaign rally in Columbia. The vice presidential nominee Joe Biden asked him to stand up and was apparently unaware of his paralysis. When Biden realized that Graham could not stand up, he asked for the crowd to stand up for him.

On November 4, 2008, Graham lost his seat after being defeated in the general election by Republican Kurt Schaefer. After the 2008 election, he announced that he had no future plans to run for public office.

Graham died on May 19, 2020, at 55.

References
Official Manual, State of Missouri, 2005-2006. Jefferson City, MO: Secretary of State.

External links
Chuck Graham's Current Legislation
Senate Member Information - Chuck Graham, D-19
Chicago Tribune Article
Sen. Chuck Graham arrested on suspicion of driving while intoxicated
Schaefer upsets Graham

Democratic Party members of the Missouri House of Representatives
Democratic Party Missouri state senators
Politicians from Columbia, Missouri
Politicians from St. Louis
1965 births
2020 deaths
University of Illinois Urbana-Champaign College of Media alumni
Politicians with paraplegia
American politicians with disabilities
20th-century American politicians
21st-century American politicians